Mniszech - is a Polish coat of arms. It was used by the Mniszech family in the times of the Polish–Lithuanian Commonwealth.

History

Blazon

Notable bearers

Notable bearers of this coat of arms include:
 Mniszech family

See also

 Polish heraldry
 Heraldry
 Coat of arms
 List of Polish nobility coats of arms

Sources 
 Kasper Niesiecki, Herbarz Polski, wyd. J.N. Bobrowicz, Lipsk 1839-1845

Polish coats of arms